USS Arkansas was a steamer acquired by the Union Navy during the American Civil War. She was used by the Union Navy as a supply ship and tender in support of the Union Navy blockade of Confederate waterways.

Arkansas commissioned in Philadelphia in 1863 

Arkansas—a wooden-hulled, barkentine-rigged, screw steamer built at Philadelphia, Pennsylvania, in 1863 as Tonawanda—was purchased by the Union Navy at Philadelphia on 27 June 1863 from Messrs. S. & J. M. Flanagan; and commissioned in the Philadelphia Navy Yard on 29 June 1863.

Assigned to the West Gulf Blockade 

Assigned to the West Gulf Blockading Squadron, the new steamer reported for duty on 10 October 1863 to Commodore Henry H. Bell who had temporary command of the squadron while Rear Admiral David G. Farragut was home on leave. She was given the task of maintaining communications with, and carrying supplies to, the Union warships which were stationed on blockade duty along the coast of Texas.

Seizure of schooner Watchful by Arkansas 

On 27 September 1863, while steaming in the Gulf of Mexico on one of these supply runs, Arkansas—then commanded by Acting Volunteer Lieutenant David Cate—encountered the schooner Watchful purportedly sailing from New York City to Matamoras, Mexico, with a cargo of lumber and petroleum. Her master claimed that his ship had begun leaking; and he, therefore, had changed course to New Orleans, Louisiana, to seek repairs. However, when Cate examined the schooner's cargo, he found crates of arms hidden under the lumber and consequently seized the vessel which he sent to New Orleans under a prize crew for adjudication. The seizure was dismissed by the Federal District Court in New Orleans, which found that the arms had been owned by a U.S. citizen, and intended for Mexican revolutionaries fighting under Benito Juárez, in which the United States was officially neutral. The district court's decision was later upheld by the U.S. Supreme Court, which found the case "destitute of all the elements of prize."

Post-war decommissioning, sale, and subsequent maritime career 

After the collapse of the Confederacy, Arkansas departed New Orleans on 5 June 1865 and sailed north to Portsmouth, New Hampshire. She was decommissioned in the navy yard there on 30 June 1865 and was sold at public auction on 20 July 1865 to Mr. George S. Leach of Portsmouth. Redocumented as Tonawanda on 1 August 1865, the steamer served as a coastal merchantman until she was stranded on The Elbow, a reef near Key Largo, Florida, on 28 March 1866 and was lost.

References 

Ships of the Union Navy
Ships built in Philadelphia
Steamships of the United States Navy
Tenders of the United States Navy
Lumber ships
1863 ships
Stores ships of the United States Navy